Cristian Gómez García (born 27 July 1989) is a Spanish footballer who plays for CE L'Hospitalet as a central midfielder.

Club career
Born in L'Hospitalet de Llobregat, Barcelona, Catalonia, Gómez began his career with his hometown club CE L'Hospitalet and made his senior debut there, appearing in two Segunda División B games in the 2007–08 season as his team eventually suffered relegation. He was an essential unit in the subsequent promotion, then scored two goals from 25 appearances to help them retain their status.

Gómez signed with RCD Espanyol in late March 2011, alongside teammate Christian Alfonso – the transfer being effective as of July – initially being assigned to the reserves. On 20 November 2011 he made his first-team and La Liga debut, playing 19 minutes in a 0–0 away draw against Real Sociedad. His first top-flight goal came on 15 April of the following year, the first of a 4–0 home rout of Valencia CF.

On 23 August 2013, Gómez was loaned to Segunda División side Real Madrid Castilla with a buyout clause. The following summer he joined Girona FC of the same league, also on loan.

Gómez terminated his contract with Espanyol on 31 August 2015, after his loan expired. Until his retirement, he competed solely in the lower divisions.

References

External links

1989 births
Living people
Spanish footballers
Footballers from L'Hospitalet de Llobregat
Association football midfielders
La Liga players
Segunda División players
Segunda División B players
Tercera División players
Tercera Federación players
CE L'Hospitalet players
RCD Espanyol B footballers
RCD Espanyol footballers
Real Madrid Castilla footballers
Girona FC players
Lleida Esportiu footballers